Shawn Darrell Jeter (born June 28, 1966) is an American former professional baseball outfielder. He is the son of former Major League Baseball outfielder Johnny Jeter.

Career
Drafted by the Toronto Blue Jays in the 7th round of the 1985 MLB amateur draft, Jeter would make his Major League Baseball debut with the Chicago White Sox on June 13, 1992, and appear in his final game on October 4, 1992.

Jeter appeared as a replacement player for the Cleveland Indians during the Major League Baseball Players Association strike during Spring training prior to the 1995 season.

See also
 List of second-generation Major League Baseball players

External links
, or Retrosheet, or Pura Pelota (Venezuelan Winter League)

1966 births
Living people
African-American baseball players
American expatriate baseball players in Canada
American expatriate baseball players in Mexico
Baseball players from Shreveport, Louisiana
Calgary Cannons players
Chicago White Sox players
Dunedin Blue Jays players
Gulf Coast Blue Jays players
Knoxville Blue Jays players
Major League Baseball outfielders
Major League Baseball replacement players
Nashville Sounds players
Saraperos de Saltillo players
Saskatoon Smokin' Guns players
St. Catharines Blue Jays players
Syracuse Chiefs players
Tiburones de La Guaira players
American expatriate baseball players in Venezuela
Vancouver Canadians players
21st-century African-American people
20th-century African-American sportspeople